Andrew Rutherfurd may refer to:

 Andrew Rutherfurd, Lord Rutherfurd (1791–1854), Scottish advocate, judge and politician
 Andrew Rutherfurd (swimmer), Bolivian swimmer

See also 
 Andrew Rutherfurd-Clark, Lord Rutherfurd-Clark (1828–1899), Scottish judge
 Andrew Rutherford (disambiguation)